Bloomfield Hills Schools (BHS) is a school district in the Greater Detroit area of the U.S. state of Michigan, with its headquarters in Bloomfield Township in Oakland County. In addition to portions of Bloomfield Township the district also serves most of the city of Bloomfield Hills and portions of Troy and West Bloomfield Township. A one-room school founded in 1822 became the foundation of the local school system, while the consolidated district dates from the 1950s. BHS has ranked in the top 5 best school systems in Michigan multiple times.

History
Around 2005 the district had a $3 million surplus. It had plans to increase enrollment by allowing out of district students to attend the district schools, so it would get increased state funding due to higher enrollment. In a two-year period ending in 2009, the district lost over 250 students and therefore about $3 million in state funding. Because of the decreased revenues, the district planned to close two schools. In a school funding system enacted in 1994, Michigan school funding entirely originates from the state, so despite the fact that Bloomfield Hills has a property rich tax base, the decrease in enrollment forced the district into an operating loss.

Schools
Wing Lake Developmental Center
Bloomfield Hills High School
Bowers Academy
International Academy
Bloomfield Hills Middle School
East Hills Middle School
West Hills Middle School
Conant Elementary
Eastover Elementary
Lone Pine Elementary
Way Elementary
Bloomin' Preschools at Conant, Fox Hills, Lone Pine
Former schools:
Andover High School
Lahser High School
Booth Elementary
Hickory Grove Elementary
Pine Lake Elementary
Traub Elementary
Vaughn Elementary

References

External links

 Bloomfield Hills Schools

School districts in Michigan
Bloomfield Hills, Michigan
Education in Oakland County, Michigan
1950s establishments in Michigan